Cliff Clevenger (August 20, 1885 – December 13, 1960) was a United States representative from Ohio. He served ten terms in  Congress from 1939 to 1959.

Biography 
Cliff Clevenger was born on a ranch near Long Pine, Brown County, Nebraska. He moved in 1895 with his parents to Lacona, Iowa, where he attended the public schools. He engaged in the mercantile business at Marengo, Iowa, 1901–1903 and at Appleton, Wisconsin, 1904-1914. He was also president of the Clevenger Stores, Bowling Green, Ohio, 1915–1926 and manager of the F. W. Uhlman Stores, Bryan, Ohio, 1927-1938.

Congress 
Clevenger was elected as a Republican to the Seventy-sixth and to the nine succeeding Congresses (January 3, 1939 - January 3, 1959). He was not a candidate for renomination in 1958. He died at his home in Tiffin, Ohio in 1960. 

Clevenger voted against the Civil Rights Act of 1957.

Death
He died on December 13, 1960 and was buried in Oak Hill Cemetery, Neenah, Wisconsin.

References

External links

1885 births
1960 deaths
American segregationists
People from Brown County, Nebraska
People from Warren County, Iowa
People from Bryan, Ohio
People from Appleton, Wisconsin
People from Tiffin, Ohio
20th-century American politicians
Republican Party members of the United States House of Representatives from Ohio